Milton "Mickey" Rutner (March 18, 1919 – October 17, 2007) was a third baseman in Major League Baseball who played briefly with the Philadelphia Athletics during the 1947 season. He was born in Hempstead, New York, and was Jewish. He attended James Monroe High School, and St. John's University in Brooklyn, New York.

In a 12-game career, Rutner was a .250 hitter (12-for-48) with one home run and four RBI, including one double and four runs. In 11 third base appearances, he recorded five putouts with 18 assists and committed three errors in 26 chances for a .885 fielding percentage.

Rutner died in Georgetown, Texas at age 88.

He is the basis for the main character, Mike Kutner, in the Eliot Asinof novel, Man On Spikes.

References

External links

Retrosheet

1919 births
2007 deaths
American expatriate baseball players in Canada
Baseball players from New York (state)
Birmingham Barons players
Jewish American baseball players
Jewish Major League Baseball players
Louisville Colonels (minor league) players
Major League Baseball third basemen
Memphis Chickasaws players
Oklahoma City Indians players
Philadelphia Athletics players
San Antonio Missions players
St. John's Red Storm baseball players
Toronto Maple Leafs (International League) players
Tulsa Oilers (baseball) players
Winston-Salem Twins players
Wilmington Blue Rocks (1940–1952) players
20th-century American Jews
21st-century American Jews
James Monroe High School (New York City) alumni